Joseph Jules Debrie was a French manufacturer of cinema camera and projectors, who founded Debrie. 

His 1908  Parvo of 1908 was considered to be state-of-the-art at the time.

References

20th-century French inventors
Cinema pioneers
French cinema pioneers
Year of birth missing
Year of death missing